The Major Arena Soccer League (MASL) is a North American professional indoor soccer league. The MASL features teams playing coast-to-coast in the United States and Mexico.

MASL is the highest level of arena soccer in North America. MASL players generally earn salaries ranging from $15,000–45,000 per season, but former USMNT and MLS star Landon Donovan earned as much as $250,000 to play one year in 2019.

History
The league was organized as the Professional Arena Soccer League on May 18, 2008, as an offshoot of the Premier Arena Soccer League (PASL-Premier), the largest amateur league in the United States. The league was originally nicknamed "PASL-Pro" to distinguish it from PASL-Premier. The first league game was played on October 25, 2008, in front of a crowd of 3,239 at the Stockton Arena, in Stockton, California, with the California Cougars defeating the Colorado Lightning 10–5. In 2011, it was announced the professional league would officially be referred to as simply PASL, while the amateur league would still be referred to as the PASL-Premier.

On March 17, 2014, one day after the 2013–2014 Major Indoor Soccer League Championship finale, United Soccer Leagues President Tim Holt announced "a number" of teams would not be returning to MISL the following year. In April 2014 it was officially announced that six teams (Baltimore Blast, Milwaukee Wave, Missouri Comets, Rochester Lancers, St. Louis Ambush, and Syracuse Silver Knights) joined PASL for the 2014–2015 season.

The league announced a change in its name from the Professional Arena Soccer League to the Major Arena Soccer League (MASL) on May 18, 2014.< This represents a merging of the MISL and PASL names. MASL fielded 23 teams for the 2014–15 season.

Split and re-merger into the MASL
In February 2016, the current owner of the Baltimore Blast, Ed Hale, announced his intentions to leave the MASL and form a new league, the Indoor Professional League. Hale was later announced as the chairman of the league, and Sam Fantauzzo, former owner of the Rochester Lancers, was announced as the first commissioner of the league. The St. Louis Ambush, Baltimore Blast, and Harrisburg Heat announced plans to join, along with the expansion Florida Tropics SC. In July 2016, the MASL was reformed as a new not for profit entity 501(c)6, a new entity separate from the previous MASL, LLC.

In August 2016, the new MASL announced that the Blast, Heat, and Ambush would return to the MASL while the Tropics would join the MASL as an expansion team. This effectively ended the IPL split with the MASL.

In a repeat of the 2015-16 Newman Cup the Baltimore Blast would go on to once again defeat Soles de Sonora 2–1.

Launch of M2
In October 2017 it was officially announced the Major Arena Soccer League 2 (M2) would launch in December 2017. The M2 serves as the developmental league for the MASL. The initial lineup of this league consisted of former MASL clubs Chicago Mustangs, Waza Flo, the reserve teams for the Ontario Fury, San Diego Sockers, former PASL clubs, and new expansion teams.

High-profile players
In the 2018–19 season, the MASL saw an influx of players to the arena game with past MLS experience, headlined by the additions of Landon Donovan to the San Diego Sockers, Jermaine Jones to the Ontario Fury, and Dwayne De Rosario with the Mississauga MetroStars.

End of the 2019–20 season
Like many sports leagues, the MASL ended its regular 2019–20 season early because of the COVID-19 pandemic.
In May, the league announced that it was looking at conducting its playoffs in a centralized location.  However, this did not take place, and the remainder of the season was cancelled.

Formation of the Major Arena Soccer League 3
On July 20, 2020, the MASL launched a new semi-professional/amateur developmental league known as M3 (Major Arena Soccer League 3) set to kickoff in 2021.  The anticipated conferences expected to play were to be in the North East, Mid-Atlantic, South East, Great Lakes,  Central North, Central South, Heartland Conference, Mountain North, Mountain South, Southwest, Pacific North, and Pacific South regions.  The Omaha Kings FC, Sunflower State FC, Grand Rapids Wanderers FC and Muskegon Risers SC were announced as the first members of the league.  However, the Risers were dropped from M3 and replaced by the Springfield Demize and Wichita Wings 2.  The league launched their new website on January 30, 2017.

Teams

Notes
a – Suspended operations following the 2019–20 season due to COVID-19, and rejoined the league for the 2021–22 season.
b – Chihuahua joined the M2 for the 2019–20 season and then suspended operations following the season due to COVID-19.  Originally planned to rejoin the M2 for the 2021–22 season, the MASL membership of the Soles de Sonora was transferred to the Savage instead.
c – Dallas suspended operations following the 2016–17 season; they rejoined the league for the 2018–19 season.
d – Mesquite suspended operations following the 2019–20 season due to COVID-19, they rejoined the league for the 2022–23 season.
e – Monterrey suspended operations following the 2014–15 season; they rejoined the league for the 2017–18 season. Monterrey suspended operations following the 2019–20 season due to COVID-19, they rejoined the league for the 2022–23 season.
f – Tacoma moved down to the PASL-Premier for the 2013–14 season, played in the WISL in the 2014–15 season and then rejoined the MASL near the end of the 2014–15 season (in 2015) replacing the Seattle Impact.

Champions

North American Finals

Ron Newman Cup

Attendance

Notes
a – Does not include 28 games where attendance was not reported.  The PASL 2008–09 regular season consisted of 86 games total.
b – Does not include 8 games where attendance was not reported. The PASL 2009–10 regular season consisted of 95 games total.
c – Does not include 10 games where attendance was not reported.  The PASL 2010–11 regular season consisted of 94 games total.
d – Due to COVID-19 only 17 out of 41 games this season where attendance was recorded. In the Ron Newman Cup Playoffs only 5 out 14 games recorded attendance.
e – Does not include 2 regular season games where attendance was not reported; the MASL 2021–22 regular season consisted of 141 games total.  Does not include 5 playoff games where attendance was not reported; the 2022 Ron Newman Cup Playoffs consisted of 18 games total.

Sponsorship
The official game ball was made by Puma SE through the 2016–17 season. Starting in the 2017–18 season, Mitre became the official ball sponsor of both the MASL and M2.

Broadcast rights
Select 2018-2019 MASL matches were broadcast on Eleven Sports Network in the United States.
Some matches are also broadcast regionally throughout the United States.
All matches since 2016–2017 season are archived on MASLtv, the MASL's YouTube Channel

Staff

Commissioner
Keith Tozer

Office of the Commissioner
Shep Messing – Chairman
JP Dellacamera – President of Communications/Media
Lindsay Mogle – Director of Communications/Team Services
Jon Ramin – Vice-President of Operations
Werner Roth – Advisor
Dennis Fry – Chief Financial Officer
Ken Stanley – Content Director
Ryan Cigich - Head of MASL Officials
Jesse Meehan - Operations Manager
Pete Richmire – League Statistician, Social Media
Óscar Sánchez – Spanish Content Manager
Phil Lavanco – Video Production Manager

Executive committee
Lane Smith (Tacoma) – President
Bernie Lilavois (Ontario) – Vice-President
Shelly Clark (St. Louis) – Secretary
Phil Salvagio (San Diego) – Treasurer
Mike Zimmerman (Milwaukee) – Member-at-Large

Former/defunct teams

References

External links

World Minifootball Federation

 
Indoor soccer leagues in the United States
Professional sports leagues in the United States
Professional sports leagues in Mexico
Multi-national professional sports leagues